Dendroctonus valens, the red turpentine beetle, is a species of bark beetle native to the forests of North America, Mexico, Guatemala and Honduras. It has been introduced to China where it has become invasive. In its native range it causes little damage, but in China it is a destructive pest and has killed more than six million pine trees.

Description
The larva is a white, legless grub, with a brown head and brown tip to the abdomen. As it grows, lateral rows of pale brown tubercles become apparent. The pupa is white; it is exarate, the antennae and legs being free and not enclosed in a cocoon. When it first emerges from the pupa it is tan, but it soon turns dark reddish-brown.

Distribution
Dendroctonus valens occurs in North and Central America. Its range extends from Canada and the northern and western parts of the United States, southwards to Mexico, Guatemala and Honduras. In the mid-1990s it was accidentally introduced into China, probably in wood packaging material, where it became established; an outbreak occurred in Shanxi Province in 1999, and it has since spread to Hebei, Henan and Shaanxi Provinces. It has a wide potential host range that could allow it to spread to other parts of China and more widely across Eurasia.

Host range
In North America, this bark beetle attacks white fir (Abies concolor) and various species of spruce (Picea) and pine (Pinus). In China it mainly attacks Manchurian red pine (Pinus tabuliformis) and sometimes Chinese white pine (Pinus armandii). Evidence that a tree has been attacked is provided by "pitch tubes" on the trunk; these appear at the holes made by the beetles and are formed of a mixture of resin and frass, varying in colour according to the species of the tree. Attacked trees exhibit shortened needles, poor retention of needles, poor growth, a sparse crown and dead branches. They may also show changes in the colour of the needles, which progressively change from green to yellowish-green, yellow, chestnut and red, by which time the tree has died.

Life cycle
In the southern parts of this beetle's native range, it may be active all year and there may be one or two overlapping generations. In more northerly regions, it may be active from May to October and have a single generation each year, or larvae may take more than a year to mature. On living trees, the beetles excavate a hole within a metre or two of the ground. On stumps or recently dead trees, the presence of the beetles can be seen from the frass they produce which is mixed with dried resin. On successfully reaching the cambium layer, a pair of beetles mate and the female excavates a vertical gallery, on one side of which she lays her eggs in small clusters. The beetles continue to enlarge their galleries. When the eggs hatch, the larvae tunnel out a large communal gallery in the phloem and cambium which becomes filled with frass. When they have completed their development, after two months or more, they pupate in individual cells in this chamber, or in short side galleries. The rate of development is dependent on the temperature. Galleries can be formed in the lower part of the trunk and the upper part of the root system, and it in the roots that the beetles hibernate in the winter. With the arrival of warmer weather in spring, the beetles bore their way out of the trunk and disperse, finding suitable host trees by detecting the ethanol, monoterpenes and pheromones produced.

Impact
In its native range, D. valens infests the stumps of newly felled trees, as well as attacking trees stressed by such things as drought, wildfire or root disturbance. Here forests have been widely planted to reduce erosion and prevent million of tonnes of soil being washed each year into the Yellow River. An area of  planted with Pinus tabuliformis since 1900 has been affected by the beetles, with six million trees being killed. Older stands of this tree have been attacked while more recently planted forests in general have not. The low winter rainfall in these mountains has stressed the trees and warm winters have encouraged the beetle's survival. A European species of bark beetle, Dendroctonus micans, which attacks spruce trees, is specifically preyed on by a predatory beetle Rhizophagus grandis. Research in China has shown that R. grandis will also attack D. valens, and the predatory beetle is being mass reared for release in China in a biological control programme for this invasive pest.

References

Woodboring beetles
Scolytinae
Beetles of North America
Beetles described in 1860
Taxa named by John Lawrence LeConte
Insect pests of temperate forests